Leysdown is a disused railway station in Leysdown-on-Sea. It opened in 1901 and closed in 1950. There are no remains of the station.

References

External links
 Leysdown station on navigable 1947 O. S. map

Disused railway stations in Kent
Former Sheppey Light Railway stations
Railway stations in Great Britain opened in 1901
Railway stations in Great Britain closed in 1950